Onstaborg was a borg in the northeast Netherlands. It was located in Sauwerd, Groningen. The borg was founded in or before 1325 by the family Onsta (also known as Onseda, Onsitha or Onsatha). The Onsta family belonged to one of the oldest and most prominent families of the Ommelanden. The Onsta family also owned an Onstaborg in Wetsinge.

See also
List of castles in the Netherlands
Onstaborg (Wetsinge)

References

External links
ubbega.nl

Borgs in Groningen (province)
Het Hogeland